Vojislav Nanović (1922–1983) was a Serbian and Yugoslav screenwriter and film director. Nanović directed the first feature film from modern-day North Macedonia.

Selected filmography
 The Magic Sword (1950)
 Frosina (1952)
 The Gypsy Girl (1953)

References

Bibliography 
 Cornis-Pope, Marcel & Neubauer, John. History of the Literary Cultures of East-Central Europe: Junctures and Disjunctures in the 19th and 20th Centuries: Types and Stereotypes. John Benjamins Publishing Company, 2010.

External links 
 

1922 births
1983 deaths
Film people from Skopje
Yugoslav film directors
Yugoslav screenwriters
20th-century screenwriters